The Widnes Vikings competed in the Championship in the 2011 season and was their first full season under new head coach Denis Betts. During this season the club was confirmed a place in the Super League under the licensing system with the announcement being made in March 2011, but failed to improve upon their league position from the previous year again finishing 5th with 38 points.

Squad

Results
{| class="wikitable" style="font-size:85%;" width="100%"
! Round !! Opponent !! Result !! Score !! HT !! H/A !! Attendance !! Date !! Tries !! Goals !! Field Goals !! Lineup!! Subs
|- bgcolor="#ddffdd"
| 1 || Sheffield || Won || 16-44 || 12-22 || A || 1,831 || 13 March || Tyrer (7,25), Finnigan (20,59), Netherton (28), Allen (41,64,73) || Tyrer 6/8 || N/A || Danny Craven, Dean Gaskell, James Ford, Steve Tyrer, Mat Gardner, Anthony Thackeray, Thomas Coyle, Ben Kavanagh, Kirk Netherton, Daniel Heckenberg, Shane Grady, Kurt Haggerty, Simon Finnigan || Chaz I’Anson, Steve Pickersgill, Dave Allen, Danny Sculthorpe ||- 
|- bgcolor="#ffdddd"
| 2 || Hunslet || Lost || 10-18 || 0-12 || H || 3,023 || 20 March || Varkulis (47), Thackeray (52) || Tyrer 1/2 || N/A || Paddy Flynn, Dean Gaskell, James Ford, Steve Tyrer, Mat Gardner, Anthony Thackeray, Thomas Coyle, Ben Kavanagh, Kirk Netherton, Steve Pickersgill (Sin Bin - 62nd Minute - Late Challenge), Dave Allen, Kurt Haggerty, Simon Finnigan || Richard Varkulis, Chaz I’Anson, Daniel Heckenberg, Shane Grady ||-
|- bgcolor="#ffdddd"
| 3 || Leigh || Lost || 54-16 || 8-16 || A || 3,198 || 27 March || Finnigan (19), Thackeray (29), Flynn (32) || Tyrer 2/3 || N/A || Danny Craven, Paddy Flynn, Tangi Ropati, Steve Tyrer, Mat Gardner, Anthony Thackeray, Chaz I’Anson, Steve Pickersgill, Kirk Netherton, Daniel Heckenberg, Dave Allen, Simon Finnigan, Ben Kavanagh || Richard Varkulis, Thomas Coyle, Chris Gerrard, Macgraff Leuluai ||-
|- bgcolor="#ddffdd"
|4 || York || Won || 76-12 || 28-6 || H || 4,087 || 3 April || Flynn (15), Tyrer (18,22,40), Craven (26), Leuluai (45), Varkulis (50), Lunt (54), Thackeray (57,77) Pickersgill (65,69) || Tyrer 12/13 || N/A || Danny Craven, Paddy Flynn, Tangi Ropati, Steve Tyrer, Dean Gaskell, Chris Gerrard, Chaz I’Anson, Steve Pickersgill, Thomas Coyle, Ben Kavanagh, Dave Allen, Macgraff Leuluai, Simon Finnigan (Sin Bin - 44th Minute - Fighting) || Richard Varkulis, Anthony Thackeray, Chris Lunt, Danny Sculthorpe ||-
|- bgcolor="#ffdddd"
| 5 || Batley || Lost || 32-12 || 10-12 || A || 1,101 || 17 April || Hulme (22), Varkulis (30) || Grady 2/2 || N/A || Danny Hulme, Mat Gardner, Tangi Ropati, James Ford, Paddy Flynn, Anthony Thackeray, Chaz I’Anson, Steve Pickersgill, Thomas Coyle, Daniel Heckenberg, Shane Grady, Macgraff Leuluai, Dave Allen || Richard Varkulis, Chris Gerrard, Logan Tomkins, Dominic Crosby ||-
|- bgcolor="#ddffdd"
| 6 || Halifax || Won || 47-36 || 38-18 || H || 3,669 || 21 April || Hulme (2,7,10), Finnigan (19,55), Tomkins (24,34), Thomas Coyle (29) || Tyrer 7/10 || Chaz I’Anson || Danny Hulme, Paddy Flynn, Tangi Ropati, Steve Tyrer, Mat Gardner, Chaz I’Anson, Joe Mellor, Richard Varkulis, Thomas Coyle, Ben Kavanagh, Simon Finnigan, Macgraff Leuluai, Dave Allen || Shane Grady, Dave Houghton, Logan Tomkins, Danny Sculthorpe ||-
|- bgcolor="#ffdddd"
| 7 || Barrow || Lost || 30-12 || 24-6' || A || 1,965 || 25 April || Mellor (21,79) || Tyrer 2/2 || N/A || Danny Hulme, Paddy Flynn, Tangi Ropati, Steve Tyrer, Mat Gardner, Chaz I’Anson, Joe Mellor, Steve Pickersgill, Thomas Coyle, Ben Kavanagh, Simon Finnigan, Macgraff Leuluai, Dave Allen || Dean Gaskell, Richard Varkulis, David Houghton, Logan Tomkins ||-
|- bgcolor="#ddffdd"
| 8 || Toulouse || Won || 26-12 || 10-6 || H || 3,601 || 28 April || Crosby (23), Gaskell (40), Mellor (42), Tomkins (48), Ropati (53) || Tyrer 3/5 || N/A || Paddy Flynn, Dean Gaskell, Tangi Ropati, Steve Tyrer, Mat Gardner, Chaz I’Anson, Joe Mellor, Steve Pickersgill, Thomas Coyle, Ben Kavanagh, Simon Finnigan, Macgraff Leuluai, Dave Allen || Shane Grady, Logan Tomkins, Danny Sculthorpe, Dominic Crosby ||-
|- style="background:#ffffdd" 
| 9 || Dewsbury || Drawn || 34-34 || 16-24 || A || 1,087 || 15 May || I’Anson (20,30), Leuluai (25), Allen (39), Flynn (63), Tyrer (70) || Tyrer 5/6 || N/A || Paddy Flynn, Dean Gaskell, Tangi Ropati, Steve Tyrer, Kevin Penny, Chaz I’Anson, Joe Mellor, Steve Pickersgill, Thomas Coyle, Ben Kavanagh, Macgraff Leulaui, Shane Grady, Dave Allen || Richard Varkulis, Logan Tomkins, Dominic Crosby, Danny Sculthorpe ||-
|- bgcolor="#ddffdd"
| 11 || Barrow || Won || 42-14 || 22-8 || H || 3,331 || 26 May || I’Anson (6), Flynn (20), Owens (24), Penny (35), Tomkins (50), Tyrer (55), Mellor (70), Thomas Coyle (80) || Tyrer 5/8 || N/A || Jack Owens, Paddy Flynn, Tangi Ropati, Steve Tyrer, Kevin Penny, Chaz I’Anson, Joe Mellor, Steve Pickersgill, Thomas Coyle, Ben Kavanagh, Simon Finnigan, Macgraff Leuluai, Dave Allen || Richard Varkulis, Mat Gardner, Logan Tomkins, Dominic Crosby ||-
|- bgcolor="#ddffdd"
| 13 || York || Won || 18-22 || 12-12 || A || 1,172 || 12 June || Haggerty (19), Leuluai (37), Crosby (43), Ropati (53) || Haggerty 1/1, Tyrer 2/3 || N/A || Paddy Flynn, Dean Gaskell, Tangi Ropati, Steve Tyrer, Kevin Penny, James Coyle, Chaz I’Anson, Steve Pickersgill, Thomas Coyle, Ben Kavanagh, Simon Finnigan, Macgraff Leuluai, Kurt Haggerty || Mat Gardner, Richard Varkulis, Chris Lunt, Dominic Crosby ||-
|- bgcolor="#ddffdd"
| 14 || Sheffield || Won || 38-24 || 22-6 || H || 4,027 || 26 June || Hulme (10), Leuluai (13), Varkulis (25), Penny (38,58), Haggerty (50), Allen (70) || Haggerty 4/6, Ropati 1/1 || N/A || Danny Hulme, Paddy Flynn, Tangi Ropati, Mat Gardner, Kevin Penny, Chaz I’Anson, Joe Mellor, Steve Pickersgill, Thomas Coyle, Ben Kavanagh, Simon Finnigan, Macgraff Leuluai, Kurt Haggerty || Richard Varkulis, Dave Allen, Dominic Crosby, James Coyle ||-
|- bgcolor="#ddffdd"
| 15 || Hunslet || Won || 22-24'' || 16-6 || A || 1,101 || 3 July || Kavanagh (16), Tyrer (51), Grady (57), Flynn (63), Haggerty (80) || Tyrer 2/5 || N/A || Danny Hulme, Paddy Flynn, Tangi Ropati, Steve Tyrer, Mat Gardner, Joe Mellor, Chaz I’Anson, Steve Pickersgill, Thomas Coyle, Richard Varkulis, Macgraff Leuluai, Kurt Haggerty, Ben Kavanagh ||  Shane Grady, Danny Sculthorpe, Logan Tomkins, Dominic Crosby ||-
|- bgcolor="#ddffdd"
| 16 || Dewsbury || Won || 36-22 || 24-10 || H || 4,030 || 10 July || Gore (3), Tomkins (6), Kavanagh (13.50), Tyrer (34), Penny (46) || Tyrer 6/6 || N/A || Danny Hulme, Paddy Flynn, Mat Gardner, Steve Tyrer, Kevin Penny, Grant Gore, Thomas Coyle, Ben Kavanagh, Logan Tomkins, Dominic Crosby, Macgraff Leuluai, Simon Finnigan, Kurt Haggerty || Richard Varkulis, Dave Allen, Shane Grady, Danny Sculthorpe ||-
|- bgcolor="#ddffdd"
| 17 || Toulouse || Won || 16-30 || 16-12 || A || 1,157 || 23 July || Tyrer (4,15), Gardner (48), Allen (55), Finnigan (73) || Tyrer 5/5 || N/A || Danny Hulme, Kevin Penny, Mat Gardner, Steve Tyrer, Paddy Flynn, Joe Mellor, Chaz I’Anson, Steve Pickersgill, Thomas Coyle, Ben Kavanagh, Shane Grady, Simon Finnigan, Kurt Haggerty ||  Richard Varkulis, Dave Allen, Macgraff Leuluai, Logan Tomkins ||-
|- bgcolor="#ddffdd"
| 18 || Batley || Won || 24-22 || 16-20 || H || 3,873 || 31 July || Kavanagh (2), Flynn (24), Mellor (37), Penny (61) || Tyrer 4/5 || N/A || Danny Hulme, Paddy Flynn, Mat Gardner, Steve Tyrer, Kevin Penny, Chaz I’Anson, Joe Mellor, Steve Pickersgill, Thomas Coyle, Ben Kavanagh, Shane Grady, Simon Finnigan, Kurt Haggerty || Richard Varkulis, Dave Allen, Macgraff Leuluai, Dominic Crosby ||-
|- bgcolor="#ffdddd"
| 19 || Leigh || Lost || 18-24 || 18-12 || H || 4,732 || 7 August || Tyrer (5), Crosby (30), Tomkins (37) || Tyrer 3/3 || N/A || Danny Hulme, Kevin Penny, Steve Tyrer, Mat Gardner, Paddy Flynn, Joe Mellor, Chaz I’Anson, Ben Kavanagh, Thomas Coyle, Steve Pickersgill, Macgraff Leuluai, Simon Finnigan, Dave Allen || Shane Grady, Richard Varkulis, Dominic Crosby, Logan Tomkins ||-
|- bgcolor="#ffdddd"
| 20 || Halifax ||| Lost || 26-24 || 12-18 || A || 2,090 || 11 August || Hulme (14), Mellor (25,39), Varkulis (50) || Tyrer 4/4 || N/A || Danny Hulme, Kevin Penny, Steve Tyrer, Tangi Ropati, Paddy Flynn, Joe Mellor, James Coyle, Dominic Crosby, Thomas Coyle, Steve Pickersgill, Simon Finnigan, Shane Grady, Kurt Haggerty || Richard Varkulis, Dave Allen, Logan Tomkins, Ben Kavanagh ||-
|- bgcolor="#ffdddd"
| 10 || Featherstone || Lost || 56-16 || 26-0 || A || 2,021 || 17 August || Hulme (47,76), Grady (74) || Haggerty 2/3 || N/A || Danny Hulme, Paddy Flynn, Tangi Ropati, Steve Tyrer, Mat Gardner, Joe Mellor, James Coyle, Steve Pickersgill, Thomas Coyle, Ben Kavanagh, Shane Grady, Simon Finnigan, Dave Allen || Richard Varkulis, Kurt Haggerty, Macgraff Leuluai, Logan Tomkins ||-
|- bgcolor="#ffdddd"
| 22 || Featherstone || Lost || 4-44 || 0-16 || H || 5,021 || 4 September || Craven (55) || Haggerty 0/1 || N/A || Danny Craven, Paddy Flynn, Steve Tyrer, Shane Grady, Kevin Penny, James Coyle, Joe Mellor, Steve Pickersgill (Sin Bin - 62nd Minute - Punching), Thomas Coyle, Ben Kavanagh, Macgraff Leuluai, Dave Allen, Kurt Haggerty || Richard Varkulis, Chaz I’Anson, Dominic Crosby, Logan Tomkins ||-
|- bgcolor="#ffdddd"
| Elimination play-offs || Sheffield || Lost || 36-20 || 14-4 || A || 564 || 9 September || Flynn (14,50), Ropati (66), Craven (74) || Craven 2/4 || N/A || Danny Craven, Paddy Flynn, Tangi Ropati, Shane Grady, Mat Gardner, Joe Mellor, James Coyle, Steve Pickersgill, Thomas Coyle, Ben Kavanagh, Macgraff Leuluai, Simon Finnigan, Dave Allen || Richard Varkulis, Kurt Haggerty, Logan Tomkins, Dominic Crosby ||-
|}Northern Rail Cup ResultsChallenge Cup Results'''

References

Widnes Vikings seasons
2011 in rugby league by club
2011 in English rugby league